Mutya ng Pilipinas 2011, the 43rd edition of Mutya ng Pilipinas, Inc., was held on December 2, 2011 at The Arena in San Juan. Vickie Marie Rushton, the winner of Mutya ng Pilipinas International 2011 and Felicia Baron named as Mutya ng Pilipinas Tourism 2011.

Results
Color keys

Special Title

Special Awards

Contestants

Crossovers from Major National Pageants prior to this date
 Mutya #11 Charisse Marie Sisperez was Miss Philippines Earth 2010 candidate

Post-Pageant Notes

 Mutya ng Pilipinas International (Intercontinental), Vickie Marie Rushton was unable to compete at Miss Intercontinental 2011 due to schedule conflict and local pageant was delayed until Dec. 2nd. The Philippines' Miss Intercontinental 2011 delegate in Alicante, Spain on Oct. 7th was handpicked by another organization under the name of Kathleen Anne Loyola Po but she was unplaced
 Mutya ng Pilipinas Tourism, Felicia Baron was unable to compete internationally due to schedule conflict 
 Mutya 1st runner-up, Diana Sunshine Rademann replaced Felicia Baron in competing at Miss Tourism International 2011 in Kuala Lumpur, Malaysia but was unplaced
 Mutya #26, Bea Rose Santiago won Binibining Pilipinas 2013 International and Miss International 2013 titles

References

External links
 Official Mutya ng Pilipinas website
  Mutya ng Pilipinas 2011 is on!

2011
2011 in the Philippines
2011 beauty pageants